Sirmaur may refer to the following places in India:
 Sirmur State, a former princely state
 Sirmaur district, a district in Himachal Pradesh
 Sirmaur, Rewa, a town in Madhya Pradesh